National Fongshan Senior Commercial & Industrial Vocational School (FSVS) is a National vocational high school with departments ranging from machine, design to business management. It also opens PE departments and comprehensive vocational department. There are currently eight departments that make up sixty five classes in the day time and twelve others in the night time, both sum up nearly 3000 registered students.

References

External links
FSVS Official Website
FSVS Alumni Union
FSVS Broadcast System I
FSVS Broadcast System II 
Vocational colleges teaching materials 
Vocational colleges admission information

See also
National Fengshan Senior High School

1956 establishments in Taiwan
Educational institutions established in 1956
High schools in Taiwan
Schools in Kaohsiung